Miroslav Rypl (born 17 March 1992) is a Czech cross-country skier. He competed in the 2018 Winter Olympics.

References

1992 births
Living people
Cross-country skiers at the 2018 Winter Olympics
Czech male cross-country skiers
Olympic cross-country skiers of the Czech Republic
Competitors at the 2017 Winter Universiade
Universiade bronze medalists for the Czech Republic
Universiade medalists in cross-country skiing